Jacob Young (born 1952) is an American screenwriter, cinematographer, film editor, and filmmaker best known for creating documentary films that explore eccentric people living in his native Appalachia.

Career 
Young was a producer at WNPB-TV in Morgantown, West Virginia, when he conceived Appalachian Junkumentary (1986), a film eventually purchased by over 90 PBS stations and winning a 1988 PBS Special Achievement Award.  It became one of 15 U.S. television shows later selected for an international screening conference.  Young was also producer for two seasons of the documentary series Different Drummer, broadcast by the BBC and Public TV.  His film Dancing Outlaw (1992) received both a 1992 Emmy Award and a 1993 American Film Institute Award for 'Best Documentary.  In 1998 Young revealed that he was considering creating a feature film using Dancing Outlaw star Jesco White.

Filmography 
 Saturday Night in Babylon (1983) — A look at reggae music and culture through the eyes of Jamaican migrant workers, originally broadcast in 1983 on the television series Vandalia Sampler.
 Appalachian Junkumentary (1987) — In which Appalachian junkyard owners explain their business, their hopes and their dreams. Originally broadcast on the PBS television series Different Drummer.
 Hammer on the Slammer (1987) — The tale of Donald Bordenkircher, who reestablished several West Virginia state prisons that were operating on the verge of disaster. Originally broadcast on the PBS television series Different Drummer.
Amazing Delores (1988) — The biograph of Delores Boyd, an unusual grandmother who writes outrageous songs and fronts a rock and roll band. Originally broadcast on the PBS television series Different Drummer.
 Point Man For God (1989) — About Bernard Coffindaffer, a rich industrialist who mounts a crusade to cover the American landscape with crosses. Originally broadcast on the PBS television series Different Drummer.
 Glitch in the System (1989) — Elmer Fike, former owner and plant manager of a small chemical company in Nitro, West Virginia, and an outspoken opponent of government regulations lead him into battle with the Environmental Protection Agency. Originally broadcast on the PBS television series Different Drummer.
 Doctor No? (1990) — A portrait of Dr. William Pierce, the author of The Turner Diaries and one of the country's preeminent white supremacists. Originally broadcast on the PBS television series Different Drummer.
 Mister D...Period (1991) — About James E. "Sug" Davis, an artist in Charleston, West Virginia, who is a self-taught man capable of painting or drawing anything that comes into his mind. But his real specialty is creating things out of found materials like a stick, a button or a piece of wood. Originally broadcast on the PBS television series Different Drummer.
 Dancing Outlaw (1992) — Portrait of Jesco White, a man struggling to live up to his father's legacy as the finest dancer in the Appalachian Mountains. Originally broadcast on the PBS television series Different Drummer.
 Fleabag : the Frank Veltrie story (1992) — Although operating at a substantial loss, a man refuses to close an old hotel that houses the helpless and destitute. Originally broadcast on the PBS television series Different Drummer.
 Dancing Outlaw II:  Jesco Goes to Hollywood (1994)  — Jesco, the Dancing Outlaw, becomes so famous that he is summoned to Hollywood to appear on Roseanne.
 Holy Cow, Swami! (1996) — Examines the life of the powerful Hare Krishna Kirtanananda Swami and uncovers murder, kidnapping, and extensive fraud.
 American Breakdown (1997) — Made for commercial broadcast, this was a pilot for a reality-based series featuring interviews of interesting people stranded by the highway in urban and rural Tennessee, originally premiered 10/26/98 on the television show Split screen.
 The Object - the Urim and Thummim (2007) — "The story of a musician's fascinating discovery of an ancient relic, as he attempts to seek it's mysterious significance and share the artifact with the world. This "docuscovery" truly has "Ancient Aliens" written all over it. Though from Todd's own melodic origin story to a Vanderbilt University professor denouncing the film's cast at attempting to gain a religious, even cultic following, the narrative tends to jump around the main focus. It seems as though Todd and the others were attempting to share their experiences and find answers that the artifact has raised. If more time had been put into researching the history and origin of the artifact instead of extraneous details and making a mockery of the people involved, the true meaning and purpose of the film would have been fulfilled. Alas, the riveting documentary seemingly falls on deaf ears as the importance of such a find, may very well change the course of history."

Recognition 
Oxford American referred to Young's film Dancing Outlaw as "now-legendary", and wrote that it was "one of the most bizarre, upsetting, and ultimately, when looked at from a certain angle, inspiring documentaries to have emerged from the South, or from anywhere, in recent memory."

In writing of a 1999 retrospective of Young's works, which included Dancing Outlaw, Dancing Outlaw 2, "and a sizable chunk of Young's documentary oeuvre", the Austin American-Statesman wrote "Young's specialty is fixing his camera on the quirky human" and called his work "life-is-nuttier-than-fiction films".

Awards and nominations 
 1988, PBS Special Achievement Award for Appalachian Junkumentary
 1992, Emmy Award for 'Best Documentary' for Dancing Outlaw
 1993, American Film Institute Award for 'Best Documentary' for Dancing Outlaw

References

External links 
 
 Official page

1952 births
American documentary filmmakers
Emmy Award winners
Living people
People from Morgantown, West Virginia